Matrix metalloproteinase-14 is an enzyme that in humans is encoded by the MMP14 gene.

Function 

Proteins of the matrix metalloproteinase (MMP) family are involved in the breakdown of extracellular matrix in normal physiological processes, such as embryonic development, reproduction, and tissue remodeling, as well as in disease processes, such as arthritis and metastasis. Deficits in MMP14 leads to premature aging, short lifespan, and cell senescence in mice, suggesting an important role of MMP14 in extracellular matrix remodeling during aging. Most MMP's are secreted as inactive pro-proteins which are activated when cleaved by extracellular proteinases.

However, the protein encoded by this gene is a member of the membrane-type MMP (MT-MMP) subfamily; each member of this subfamily contains a potential transmembrane domain suggesting that these proteins are tethered to the cell surface rather than secreted.

"This protein activates MMP2 protein, and this activity may be involved in tumor invasion."

Interactions 

MMP14 has been shown to interact with TIMP2.

See also 
 Matrix metalloproteinase
 ARK5

References

Further reading

External links 
 The MEROPS online database for peptidases and their inhibitors: M10.014

Matrix metalloproteinases
EC 3.4.24